Annie Villiger (4 April 1914 – 13 June 1987) was a Swiss diver. She competed in the women's 3 metre springboard event at the 1936 Summer Olympics.

References

External links
 

1914 births
1987 deaths
Swiss female divers
Olympic divers of Switzerland
Divers at the 1936 Summer Olympics
Place of birth missing